Mohamed Yehia El Horria Emam (‎; 28 November 1943 – 9 January 2016), known as Hamada Emam, was Vice President of The Egyptian Football Association (EFA) and a former Egyptian football player. Hamada Emam scored 74 goals for Zamalek SC in the Egyptian Premier League.

He was playing for Zamalek and the Egyptian National Team. He was born in Cairo as a son of Yehia Emam (Egypt's Goalkeeper) and father of Hazem Emam. Hamada Emam died on 9 January 2016. He won three Egyptian league titles for Zamalek and two Egypt cups.

Career statistics

Honours

Club
Zamalek
 Egyptian League (3 titles)
 Egypt Cup (2 titles)

See also
 List of Zamalek SC players
 1962 Egypt Cup Final

References

1948 births
Egyptian footballers
Egypt international footballers
Zamalek SC players
Egyptian expatriate footballers
2016 deaths
Egyptian Premier League players
Association football forwards
Emam family